Olatunji Yearwood (born September 3, 1985), better known by his mononym Olatunji, is a Trinidadian soca artist.

Career
Yearwood was born in Trinidad to Edward Yearwood, a well-known composer and mother Mairoon Ali, a Trinidadian actress, radio personality and teacher. He established himself as a Soca talent early on when he entered and won multiple talent shows while still in his teens, including the national Junior Calypso Monarch competition. His shot to global fame when he won Trinidad's famous Soca Groovy Monarch/International Soca Monarch in 2015, performing his blockbuster single "Ola." He is the last International Groovy Soca Monarch champion, as the competition's format was changed in 2016 to exclude that category. 

Yearwood was featured in The Fader Magazine as the face of Afrosoca music, an emerging genre that fuses Soca and Afrobeats. He sees the release of his debut international album 'Awakening' on July 1, 2016, from FOX FUSE - the world's largest label for soca music. 

In September 2018, Yearwood was featured as a contestant on The X Factor UK (Series 15). During his audition, a technical glitch resulted in the wrong backing track initially being played, however, once fixed, accompanied by two backup dancers, he went on to sing his original song called "Bodyline". His performance eventually resulted in a standing ovation from all four judges and, thus, four "yeses" allowing him to proceed to the next round. He made it to the live shows, and performed another bespoke song, "Jiggle It", but became the first act to be eliminated, finishing in 16th place.

Discography

Singles
 "Wining Good (Bharati Laraki)" (FOX FUSE, 2014)
 "Ola" (FOX FUSE, 2014)
 "Oh Yay" (FOX FUSE, 2015)
 "OLTL (One Life To Live)" featuring System32 (FOX FUSE, 2015)
 "Oh Yay Remix" featuring Runtown (FOX FUSE, 2016)
 "Tun Fo Meh" (FOX FUSE, 2016)
 "Bodyline" (FOX FUSE, 2017)
 "Mating Call" (FOX FUSE, 2018)

Albums
 Awakening (FOX FUSE, 2016)

References

21st-century Trinidad and Tobago male singers
21st-century Trinidad and Tobago singers
Soca musicians
1985 births
Living people
The X Factor (British TV series) contestants
People from Port of Spain
People from Blackpool